Orocrambus heteraulus is a moth in the family Crambidae. It was described by Edward Meyrick in 1905. It is endemic to New Zealand. This species has been recorded to inhabit the Humboldt Range and the Routeburn Valley.

The wingspan is 28–35 mm. Adults have been recorded from in December and February.

References

Crambinae
Moths described in 1905
Endemic fauna of New Zealand
Moths of New Zealand
Taxa named by Edward Meyrick
Endemic moths of New Zealand